Dinosaur World is a chain of outdoor dinosaur theme parks in the US. Their locations include Plant City, Florida; Glen Rose, Texas; and Cave City, Kentucky. The parks feature over 150 life-size dinosaur sculptures created by Christer Svensson. The Florida location opened in November 1998, the Kentucky location five years after, and Texas location followed five years after that.

In each park, life-size dinosaur statues are placed among native vegetation or water features to simulate animals in a wild environment. Plant species that date from the time of the dinosaurs can be found on the grounds and identified with small signs. At a "Fossil Dig", kids can dig at a sand table for real fossils.

The dinosaur sculptures themselves are made from a base of carved polystyrene foam, covered with fiberglass, then putty which is textured as the skin and painted. Each dinosaur is made on location at the park; about three new dinosaur replicas are added each year.

See also 
 List of dinosaur parks

References

External links

Article and video about the Walking Map of Dinosaur World Plant City, FL

Buildings and structures in Hillsborough County, Florida
Dinosaur museums in the United States
Dinosaur sculptures
Museums in Barren County, Kentucky
Museums in Somervell County, Texas
Roadside attractions in the United States
Tourist attractions in Hillsborough County, Florida
Tourist attractions in the Tampa Bay area